Laboratório Nacional de Energia e Geologia (National Laboratory of Energy and Geology) is a Portuguese public R&D institution in the fields of energy and geology. It was created in 2007 by the merger of the former National Institute of Engineering, Technology and Innovation with several smaller research and regulation bodie.s

References

External links

Research institutes in Portugal
2007 establishments in Portugal
Energy research institutes
Earth science research institutes
Multidisciplinary research institutes
Amadora